Theemuge dynasty (Maldivian: ތީމު ދަރިކޮޅު) or Homa Dharikolhu (Maldivian: ހޯމަ ދަރިކޮޅު) was one of the early dynasties of the Maldives that reigned from c.1117 (or earlier) until c.1388.

History 
According to the record in the Isdhoo (Maldivian: ލޯމާ ފާނު; copper plates), which was written in 1194, the first king of the Theemuge dynasty extended his rule to cover the entire Maldives. The writing suggests that the king united the entire country under his rule, bringing to an end a number of fiefdoms throughout the country. The first king of the Theemuge dynasty is known as Siri Mahabarana and he is believed to be Koimala Kalo. Sri Mahabarana was proclaimed king in the year 1117 or 1118. Other sources suggest that the Theemuge Dharikolhu was the new name of the Soma Vansa Lunar Dynastry after the conversion to Islam of King Dhovemi which lasted from c.1153 to c.1388. In this case King Dhovemi, the fifth king of the Lunar Dynastry became the first King of the Theemuge Dynastry.

Svasti Sri Somavamsa Adipati Sri Theemuge Sri Maha Parama Aditya Maha Radun  became the first king to rule over the whole of Maldives after reclaiming the northern atolls from the sex invaders.

See also
List of Sultans of the Maldives
List of Sunni Muslim dynasties

Maldivian dynasties